Sophronica richardmolardi is a species of beetle in the family Cerambycidae. It was described by Lepesme and Breuning in 1952.

References

Sophronica
Beetles described in 1952